JSW Cement is part of the diversified US$22 billion JSW Group. As one of India’s leading business houses, JSW Group also has other business interests in sectors such as steel, energy, infrastructure, paints, sports and venture capital. JSW Cement is the World's #1 eco-friendly cement company with a current capacity of 17 MTPA across its manufacturing units at Vijayanagar in Karnataka, Nandyal in Andhra Pradesh, Salboni in West Bengal, Jajpur in Odisha and Dolvi in Maharashtra. It is expected to achieve 21 MTPA capacity by end of FY23. The company's subsidiary, Shiva Cement, is currently investing over Rs. 1,500 crores in a 1.36 MTPA clinker unit project to be established in Sundergarh district of Odisha; this project also includes setting up of a 1 MTPA grinding unit and associated facilities. The company is present across the entire value-chain of building materials comprising cement, concrete & construction chemicals. This gives JSW Cement a unique advantage to cater to the diverse needs of the construction industry with its premium, high quality & eco-friendly products. The company converts industrial waste into cement and other building materials thereby ensuring a greener future for the next generation. Its capable marketing & service teams ensure that customer’s needs are met within the shortest time by extensively leveraging digital tools, mobile-tech and conversational commerce interventions. Its business vision has been acknowledged through various awards including Best Infrastructure Brand (2021), Environment Excellence Gold Award (2018), Greentech Environment Award (2018) among others.

References

JSW Group
Manufacturing companies based in Mumbai
Cement companies of India
Indian brands
Indian companies established in 2009
2009 establishments in Maharashtra
Manufacturing companies established in 2009